John Leijh is an association football player who represented New Zealand at international level.

Leijh made his full All Whites debut in a 6–0 win over Fiji on 29 June 1979 and ended his international playing career with 14 A-international caps to his credit, his final cap an appearance in a 2–1 win over Fiji on 18 October 1984. He is now married with 4 children (1 son and 3 daughters) and works as a registered architect.

References 

Year of birth missing (living people)
Living people
New Zealand association footballers
New Zealand international footballers
Association football defenders
Association football midfielders